Goose Cove is a settlement in Newfoundland and Labrador. As of the 2021 census it has a population of 172, down 1.1% from it's population of 174 in the 2016 census.

References

Populated places in Newfoundland and Labrador